Kim was a German brand of cigarettes that was manufactured by British American Tobacco.

The correct product brand name was Kim Slimsize and came in a few varieties, most notably Kim Red Slimsize and Kim Blue Slimsize.

History
The brand was originally founded in the 1940s by "Oriental-Kim Cigaretten-Werk G.m.b.H." and re-introduced in 1970 by BAT Germany, the cigarette has a length of 9.5 cm and looks striking especially because of its slim shape. The mark was protected in 1972 in Germany and is popular with women, which is why the brand is also often referred to as a "Woman's cigarette". It has been discontinued since 2009.

Main market was Germany. Other markets were Belgium, Netherlands, France, Austria, Italy, Poland, Hungary, Romania, Czech Republic, Slovenia, Belarus and Australia and Cuba.

Packaging
The box is completely white from the opening until the middle of the packaging. At the bottom of the pack a wave pattern is visible, depending on the variant either in orange-red (Red Slimsize) or turquoise-blue (Blue Slimsize).

Advertising slogans
 1970: "Pleasure, which suits us."
 1970: "Lean and racy head up embers."
 1971: "Talk a little - Kim a little."
 1972: "Too chic for a man's hands."
 1988: "Not like all the others"

Products

 Kim Red Slimsize
 Kim Blue Slimsize

Below are all the current brands of Kim cigarettes sold, with the levels of tar, nicotine and carbon monoxide included.

See also

 Tobacco smoking

Literature

References

British American Tobacco brands